Care Programme Approach (CPA) in the United Kingdom is a system of delivering community mental health services to individuals diagnosed with a mental illness.  It was introduced in England in 1991 and by 1996 become a key component of the mental health system in England. The approach requires that health and social services assess need, provided a written care plan, allocate a care coordinator, and then regularly review the plan with key stakeholders, in keeping with the National Health Service and Community Care Act 1990.

History and impact

In 1999 the approach was simplified to standard and enhanced levels, the term key worker was changed to care coordinator, and there was an emphasis on risk management, employment and leisure, and the needs of the carer.

There is some criticism that the approach has changed the role of staff away from implementing clinical interventions into administrative tasks, that the policy is carried out inconsistently, and has not been well aligned to clinical models of case management.  Formal review on the impact and effectiveness of this initiative has been difficult because of the variation of clinical interventions given under a CPA model.

CPA in a prison setting 
A research paper by M. Georgiou and J. Jethwa discusses the purpose of the CPA model and discusses key themes in its benefits and shortcomings, in order to provide a more organized framework for care of inmates in a prison setting. The key themes are listed below.

Objectives of CPA 

 Interagency collaboration
 Catering to the complex needs of the patient
 Ongoing care (upon release from prison)
 Patient involvement in CPA, centered around them

Challenges faced when implementing CPA 

 Responsibilities are not clear
 Geographically deprived for program outreach
 Patient has little or no awareness of CPA
 Lack of understanding CPA process
 Prison capacity to implement program (e.g., too many cases, not enough resources, patient dropout from CPA)

See also
 Case management
 Care in the community
 Deinstitutionalisation

References

External links
CPA Association
DOH Making the CPA work for you
Rethink CPA information

Disability in law
Treatment of mental disorders
Mental health law in the United Kingdom
Mental health in England